Seán Calleary (27 October 1931 – 4 June 2018) was an Irish Fianna Fáil politician who served as a Minister of State from 1979 to 1981, from October to December 1982, and from 1987 to 1992. He served as a Teachta Dála (TD) for the Mayo East constituency from 1973 to 1992.

His father Phelim Calleary had been a TD for the Mayo North constituency from 1952 to 1969. A native of Ballina, County Mayo, he was educated at Garbally College in Ballinasloe, County Galway and University College Galway where he graduated with a degree civil engineering. He was a member of Mayo County Council from 1967 to 1987, before he became a Fianna Fáil TD for Mayo East from 1973 to 1992.

When Charles Haughey took office as Taoiseach in December 1979, Calleary was appointed as Minister of State at the Department of the Public Service and Minister of State at the Department of Labour. He remained in these positions until June 1981, when Fianna Fáil lost office.

Fianna Fáil returned to government in March 1982. Calleary served briefly as Minister of State at the Department of Trade, Commerce and Tourism from October to December 1982, when Fianna Fáil lost office again.

In March 1987, Haughey returned to office, and Calleary was appointed as Minister of State at the Department of Foreign Affairs with responsibility for Overseas Aid. He was appointed to the same position in 1989. He was not retained by Albert Reynolds, who succeeded Haughey as Fianna Fáil leader and Taoiseach in February 1992.

His son Dara Calleary has been a Fianna Fáil TD for the Mayo constituency since the 2007 general election.

Calleary died on 4 June 2018 at the age of 86.

See also
Families in the Oireachtas

References

1931 births
2018 deaths
Sean
Fianna Fáil TDs
Members of the 20th Dáil
Members of the 21st Dáil
Members of the 22nd Dáil
Members of the 23rd Dáil
Members of the 24th Dáil
Members of the 25th Dáil
Members of the 26th Dáil
Local councillors in County Mayo
Politicians from County Mayo
Ministers of State of the 26th Dáil
Ministers of State of the 25th Dáil
Ministers of State of the 23rd Dáil
Ministers of State of the 21st Dáil
People from Ballina, County Mayo
People educated at Garbally College
Irish civil engineers